Boom Baby Boom is the fifth studio album by Australian rock band Mondo Rock, released in September 1986. It peaked at number 27 on the Kent Music Report.

Reception
Cash Box magazine called the album a "clever, dance-rock outing full of potential singles. Enough quirky, progressive elements to interest modern-leaning musos; enough pop craftsmanship and crisp song writing to catch traditionalists."

Track listing

Personnel
Mondo Rock:
Ross Wilson – vocals, harmonica
Eric McCusker – guitar, backing vocals
Duncan Veall – keyboards, backing vocals
Andrew Ross – keyboards, saxophone, backing vocals
James Gillard – bass, backing vocals
John James Hackett – drums, percussion, guitar, backing vocals

with:
Alex Pertout – percussion
Bruce Allen – second saxophone on "Rule of Threes" and "Roman Holiday"
Greg Thorne – trumpet on "Rule of Threes"
Bob Venier – flugelhorn
Angus Davidson, Pat Wilson, Ross Hannaford, Venetta Fields – backing vocals

Production team:
Producer, Engineer, Mixed by – Bill Drescher
Assistant Engineers – Angus Davidson (recording), Charlie Brocco (mixing)

Charts

References 

Mondo Rock albums
1986 albums
Polydor Records albums
Columbia Records albums